The Middle North Sea Group (abbreviation: NM) is a group of geologic formations in the Dutch subsurface, part of the North Sea Supergroup. The three formations of this group form a thick sequence of sediments in the Dutch subsurface, they crop out in parts of the southern Netherlands. The Middle North Sea Group was deposited from the late Eocene to late Oligocene, between 37 and 23 million years ago.

Its three formations are (from old to young) the Tongeren, Rupel and Veldhoven Formations. The Tongeren Formation has a continental to paralic facies, the other two consist mainly of shallow marine clays and sands.

References

Geologic groups of Europe
Geologic formations of the Netherlands
Lithostratigraphy of the Netherlands